Fucking Åmål (released in some countries as Show Me Love) is a 1998 Swedish romantic comedy drama film written and directed by Lukas Moodysson in his feature-length directorial debut. It stars Rebecka Liljeberg and Alexandra Dahlström as two seemingly disparate teenage girls who begin a tentative romantic relationship. The film was released theatrically in Sweden on 23 October 1998, and first premiered internationally at the 1998 Cannes Film Festival.

The film received an overwhelmingly positive reception and won four Guldbagge Awards (Sweden's official film awards) at the 1999 ceremony. Its international awards include the Teddy Award at the 1999 Berlin International Film Festival, and the Special Jury Prize at the 34th Karlovy Vary International Film Festival.

The Swedish title refers to the small town of Åmål in Västra Götaland County, western Sweden. However, only a few scenes were filmed in Åmål, and they were not included in the final version. The main shooting took place in the nearby town of Trollhättan, the location of producing company Film i Väst's studios.

Plot
Two girls, Agnes and Elin, attend school in the small town of Åmål, Sweden. Elin is outgoing and popular but finds her life unsatisfying and dull. Agnes, by contrast, has no real friends and is constantly depressed. Agnes is in love with Elin but cannot find any way to express it.

Agnes's parents worry about their daughter's reclusive life and try to be reassuring. Her mother decides, against Agnes's will, to throw a 16th birthday party for her. Agnes is afraid no one will come. Viktoria, a girl in a wheelchair, shows up and Agnes shouts at her in front of her parents, telling her they are friends only because no one else will talk to them. Agnes, overcome with anger and depression, goes to her room and cries into her pillow shouting that she wishes she were dead, while her father tries to soothe her. Viktoria leaves and Agnes's family eats the food made for the party.

Elin arrives at Agnes's house, mainly as an excuse to avoid going to another party, where there will be a boy (Johan, played by Mathias Rust) she wants to avoid. Elin's older sister, Jessica, who comes with her, dares her to kiss Agnes, who is rumoured to be a lesbian. Elin fulfills the dare and then runs out with Jessica, only to soon feel guilty for having humiliated Agnes.

After becoming drunk at the other party, Elin gets sick and throws up. Johan tries to help her and ends up professing his love to her. Elin leaves Johan and the party, only to return to Agnes's house to apologize for how she acted earlier. In doing so, Elin stops Agnes from cutting herself. She even manages to persuade Agnes to return with her to the other party. On the way, Elin shares her real feelings about being trapped in Åmål. She asks Agnes about being a lesbian and believes that their problems could be solved by leaving Åmål and going to Stockholm. On impulse, Elin persuades Agnes to hitchhike to Stockholm, which is a five-hour journey by car. They find a driver who agrees to take them, believing them to be sisters who are visiting their grandmother. While sitting in the back seat, they have their first real kiss. The driver sees them and, shocked at the behaviour of the two 'sisters', orders them to leave the car.

Elin discovers that she is attracted to Agnes but is afraid to admit it. She proceeds to ignore Agnes and refuses to talk to her. Elin's sister Jessica sees that she is in love and pushes her to figure out who it is. To cover the fact that she is in love with Agnes, Elin lies, pretending to be in love with Johan, and loses her virginity during a short-lived relationship with him. Elin eventually admits her feelings, when, after a climactic scene in a school bathroom, they are forced to 'out' their relationship to the school.

The film ends with Elin and Agnes sitting in Elin's bedroom drinking chocolate milk. Elin explains that she often adds too much chocolate until her milk is nearly black. She must fill another glass with milk and mix it and that her sister Jessica often gets mad that she finishes the chocolate. Elin has the last word saying "It makes a lot of chocolate milk. But that doesn't matter."

Cast
 Alexandra Dahlström as Elin Olsson
 Rebecka Liljeberg as Agnes Ahlberg
 Erica Carlson as Jessica Olsson
 Mathias Rust as Johan Hulth
 Stefan Hörberg as Markus
 Josefine Nyberg as Viktoria
 Ralph Carlsson as Agnes's father, Olof
 Maria Hedborg as Agnes's mother, Karin
 Axel Widegren as Agnes's little brother, Oskar
 Jill Ung as Elin's and Jessica's mother, Birgitta

Title
The original title of the film, Fucking Åmål, refers to the girls' feelings about their small town: In a key scene, Elin shouts in desperation "varför måste vi bo i fucking jävla kuk-Åmål?" (which roughly translates to "why do we have to live in fucking bloody cock-Åmål?").

According to Moodysson, the problem with the original title started when the film was Sweden's candidate for the Academy Awards, though eventually it was not chosen as a nominee. The Hollywood industry magazine Variety refused to run an advertisement for Fucking Åmål. Thus, American distributor Strand Releasing asked for a new title. Moodysson took the new title from the song at the end of the film, by Robyn. Distributors in other native English-speaking countries then followed suit. 
 
  ("Discovering Love")
  ("School Friends")
  ("Love is Love") The Czech title is based on a Lucie Bílá song of the same name, which references homosexuality.
  ("Show Me Love")
 Hebrew: F- Åmål
 English: Show Me Love
 French (Canada): Qui Aimes-Tu? ("Who do you love/like?")

Reception

Political controversy
Even before the film was completed, it created controversy in the town of Åmål. Local politicians campaigned to get the title changed because they argued that it would show the town in an unfair way and even undermine it as an economic centre. Further pressure was brought on the makers of the film, the Film i Väst studio, who are partly financed by Swedish local authorities, including Åmål.

However, the local complaints had no effect on the content or release of the film. Since the release, the town of Åmål has tried to embrace the publicity generated, despite the fact that the town's name is missing from the English title. In the early 2000s the town founded the pop music "Fucking Åmål Festival."

Critical and commercial response
Fucking Åmål received the highest audience figures for a Swedish film in 1998–9, with a total audience of 867,576 and a total audience for the whole of Europe of 2,100,000. Some reports outside Sweden stated that in Sweden the film had outgrossed the Hollywood film Titanic. In fact, Titanic had over twice as many viewers as Show Me Love in Sweden in 1998. Based on 43 reviews collected by the film review aggregator Rotten Tomatoes, 91% of critics gave Show Me Love a positive review. It is among the top ten of the British Film Institute list of the 50 films you should see by the age of 14.

The film received consistently good reviews, including the realism and credibility of its portrayal of what it is like to be a teenager in a small town in the 1990s. In addition, the efforts of the young actors were praised. Jan-Olov Andersson at Aftonbladet felt that Dahlström's and Liljeberg's imaginative appearance and interaction was "sensationally credible", and Bo Ludvigsson at Svenska Dagbladet wrote that it was "a warm, strong and confident film about the courage to be human". Ludvigsson also believed that Fucking Åmål, with its storytelling drive, leave and authenticity, was well above most of the Swedish films of recent years. Anders Hansson at Göteborgs-Posten thought that director Moodysson with fairly ordinary elements created "a film with unusual rise".

Autostraddle placed it at number one on its "Top 10 Best Lesbian Movies" list.

Cultural impact
According to Russian singer Lena Katina, producer Ivan Shapovalov was inspired to create the pop duo t.A.T.u. after the release of this film. The track "Show Me Love" is featured in their album 200 km/h in the Wrong Lane.

Soundtrack
The film's soundtrack was released through Metronome Records and consists of songs in English and Swedish language. Swedish band Broder Daniel, who contributed three English language songs to Fucking Åmål, saw a spike in popularity after the film's release. The band also released an EP titled Fucking Åmål.

Fucking Åmål / Musiken Från Filmen
Label: Metronome Records
Format: CD, compilation
Country: Sweden
Released: 1998

Awards and nominations

|- 
! rowspan="24" | 1999
| rowspan="2" | Amanda Award
| Best Foreign Feature Film 
| Fucking Åmål, director Lukas Moodysson
| 
| 
|-
| Best Nordic Feature Film
| Lukas Moodysson
| 
| 
|- 
| Atlantic Film Festival
| Best International Feature
| Lukas Moodysson
| 
| 
|-
| rowspan="2" | Berlin International Film Festival
| C.I.C.A.E. Award - Recommendation (Panorama) 
| Lukas Moodysson
| 
| 
|-
| Teddy Award - Best Feature Film 
| Lukas Moodysson
| 
| 
|-
| British Film Institute Awards
| Sutherland Trophy - Special Mention
| Lukas Moodysson
| 
| 
|-
| Manaki Brothers Film Festival
| Special Jury Award
| Ulf Brantås
| 
| 
|-
| Cinema Jove - Valencia International Film Festival
| Golden Moon of Valencia
| Lukas Moodysson
| 
| 
|-
| European Film Awards
| Best Film
| Lars Jönsson
| 
| 
|-
| rowspan="2" | Flanders International Film Festival Ghent
| Student Jury Award
| Lukas Moodysson
| 
| 
|-
| Grand Prix
| Lukas Moodysson
| 
| 
|-
| rowspan="5" | Guldbagge Awards
| Best Film 
| Lars Jönsson
| 
| 
|-
| Best Director
| Lukas Moodysson
| 
| 
|-
| Best Screenplay
| Lukas Moodysson
| 
| 
|-
| Best Actress in a Leading Role
| Alexandra DahlströmRebecka Liljeberg 
| 
| 
|-
| Best Actor in a Supporting Role
| Ralph Carlsson 
| 
| 
|-
| rowspan="4" | Karlovy Vary International Film Festival
| Audience Award
| Lukas Moodysson
| 
| 
|-
| FICC - The Don Quixote Prize
| Lukas Moodysson
| 
| 
|-
| Special Jury Prize
| Lukas Moodysson
| 
| 
|-
| Crystal Globe
| Lukas Moodysson
| 
| 
|-
| rowspan="3" | Kyiv International Film Festival "Molodist"
| Best Full-Length Fiction Film
| Lukas Moodysson
| 
| 
|-
| FIPRESCI 
| Lukas Moodysson
| 
| 
|-
| Youth Jury Award - Full-Length Feature Film
| Lukas Moodysson
| 
| 
|-
| Verzaubert International Gay & Lesbian Film Festival
| Rosebud - Best Film
| Lukas Moodysson
| 
| 
|- 
! rowspan="3" | 2000
| Bodil Awards
| Best Non-American Film
| Lukas Moodysson
| 
| 
|- 
| GLAAD Media Award
| Outstanding Film – Limited Release
| Lukas Moodysson
| 
| 
|-
| International Film Festival Rotterdam
| MovieZone Young Jury Award
| Lukas Moodysson
| 
|

See also

 List of submissions to the 71st Academy Awards for Best Foreign Language Film
 List of Swedish submissions for the Academy Award for Best Foreign Language Film

References

External links
 
 
 

1998 films
1998 comedy-drama films
1998 directorial debut films
1998 LGBT-related films
1990s coming-of-age comedy-drama films
1998 romantic comedy-drama films
1990s Swedish films
1990s Swedish-language films
1990s teen comedy-drama films
1990s teen romance films
Best Film Guldbagge Award winners
Coming-of-age romance films
Film controversies in Sweden
Films directed by Lukas Moodysson
Films set in Dalsland
Films shot in Trollhättan
Films whose director won the Best Director Guldbagge Award
Lesbian-related films
LGBT-related coming-of-age films
LGBT-related romantic comedy-drama films
Political controversies in film
Swedish coming-of-age drama films
Swedish LGBT-related films
Swedish romantic comedy-drama films
Swedish teen drama films
Teen LGBT-related films
Teensploitation
Zentropa films